The Southern Governors' Association (SGA), formerly the Southern Governors Conference, was a United States association of governors founded in 1934 and dissolved in 2016. It was the oldest and historically the largest of the regional governors associations. Since its first meeting  years ago to discuss the repeal of discriminatory rates for transporting goods by rail, the SGA had represented the common interests of Southern chief executives and provided a vehicle for promoting them. SGA was a nonpartisan enterprise where shareholders could exchange views and access data, information and expertise on issues of general importance in order to augment the deliberations of public, private and non-profit decision-makers in the American South.  SGA operated as an instrumentality of the states.

The last SGA Chairman was Jay Nixon of Missouri. After nearly 82 years, the Southern Governors' Association was officially dissolved on June 30, 2016 by the majority of its members-in-good standing. At the time of its dissolution, the association membership included sixteen states (Alabama, Arkansas, Florida, Georgia, Kentucky, Louisiana, Maryland, Mississippi, Missouri, North Carolina, Oklahoma, South Carolina, Tennessee, Texas, Virginia, and West Virginia), the Commonwealth of Puerto Rico, and the U.S. Virgin Islands.

Chairs

 1934-35	 	 	
 1935-36
 1936-37
 1937-38
 1938-39
 1939-40       E.D. Rivers Georgia D
 1940-42       Frank M. Dixon Alabama D
 1941-42	 	 	 
 1942-43	 	 	 
 1943-44	Prentice Cooper Tennessee	D
 1944-45	 	 	 
 1945-46	Robert S. Kerr      Oklahoma	D
 1946-47	R. Gregg Cherry	North Carolina	D
 1947-48	William Preston Lane	Maryland	D
 1948-49	William Munford Tuck	Virginia	D
 1949-50	J. Strom Thurmond	South Carolina	D
 1951-52	Allan Shivers	Texas	D
 1952-53	Herman Talmadge	Georgia	D
 1953-54	Johnston Murray	Oklahoma	D
 1954-55	L. W. Wetherby	Kentucky	D
 1955-56	Frank G. Clement	Tennessee	R
 1956-57	Luther H. Hodges	North Carolina	D
 1957-58	LeRoy Collins	Florida	D
 1958-59	James P. Coleman	Mississippi	D
 1959-60	James Lindsay Almond	Virginia	D
 1950-51	Fielding Wright	Mississippi	D
 1960-61	Price Daniel	Texas	D
 1961-62	Buford Ellington	Tennessee	D
 1962-63	Orval Faubus	Arkansas	D
 1963-64	C. Farris Bryant	Florida	D
 1964-65	John B. Connally	Texas	D
 1965-66	J. Millard Tawes	Maryland	D
 1966-67	Edward T. Breathitt	Kentucky	D
 1967-68	Dan K. Moore	North Carolina	D
 1968-69	Robert E. McNair	South Carolina	D
 1969-70	Winthrop Rockefeller	Arkansas	R
 1970-71	John Bell Williams	Mississippi	D
 1971-72	Luis A Ferré	Puerto Rico	NPP
 1972-73	George Wallace	Alabama	D
 1973-74	Melvin H. Evans	U.S. Virgin Islands	R
 1974-75	Reubin Askew	Florida	D
 1975-76	Mills E. Godwin	Virginia	R
 1976-77	Dolph Briscoe	Texas	D
 1977-78	James B. Edwards	South Carolina	R
 1978-79	Edwin W. Edwards	Louisiana	D
 1979-80	John N. Dalton	Virginia	R
 1980-81	Carlos Romero-Barcelo	Puerto Rico	NPP
 1981-82	Richard W. Riley	South Carolina	D
 1982-83	William P. Clements	Texas	R
 1983-84	Charles S. Robb	Virginia	D
 1984-85	Bob Graham	Florida	D
 1985-86	James G. Martin	North Carolina	R
 1986-87	Martha Layne Collins	Kentucky	D
 1987-88	Joe Frank Harris	Georgia	D
 1988-89	Michael Castle	Delaware	R
 1989-90	Ray Mabus	Mississippi	D
 1990-91	Wallace G. Wilkinson	Kentucky	D
 1991-92	Carroll A. Campbell, Jr.	South Carolina	R
 1992-93	Doug Wilder	Virginia	D
 1993-94	Zell Miller	Georgia	D
 1994-95	Kirk Fordice Mississippi	R
 1995-96	Mel Carnahan Missouri	D
 1996-97	George Allen	Virginia	R
 1997-98	Pedro Rossello Puerto Rico	NPP
 1998-99	Don Sundquist Tennessee	R
 1999-2000	Mike Huckabee	Arkansas	R
 2000-01	Paul E. Patton	Kentucky	D
 2001-02	Mike Foster, Jr.	Louisiana	R
 2002-03	Bob Wise	West Virginia	D
 2003-04	Mark Warner	Virginia	D
 2004-05	Sonny Perdue	Georgia	R
 2005-06	Kathleen Blanco	Louisiana	D
 2006-07	Haley Barbour Mississippi	R
 2007-08	Joe Manchin	West Virginia	D
 2008-09	Tim Kaine	Virginia	D
 2009-10	Bob Riley	Alabama	        R
 2010-11	Bev Perdue	North Carolina	D
 2011-12	Luis G. Fortuño Puerto Rico	R

References

State governors of the United States
1934 establishments in the United States
Government-related professional associations in the United States
Politics of the Southern United States
Organizations established in 1934
2016 disestablishments in the United States